The 47° Targa Florio took place on 5 May 1963, on the Circuito Piccolo delle Madonie, Sicily (Italy). Porsche took the overall victory, marking the beginning of its dominance at the event which – apart from 1965 – will last until 1971.

Race
Strong of two consecutive victories in 1961 and 1962, Scuderia Ferrari deployed its new 250 P prototypes which previously received a double victory at the Sebring event. However, the Scuderia was deprived of driver Nino Vaccarella because he was not in compliance with driving documents. After an early dominance, the two 250 P driven by John Surtees and Willy Mairesse respectively, were both crashed. The Ferrari 196 SP driven by Lorenzo Bandini and Ludovico Scarfiotti then took the lead, pursued by the Porsche 718 GTR of Jo Bonnier and Carlo Maria Abate. Mairesse was again chosen for driving the leading 196 SP for the last shift, but a driving error costed him the first place, won by the 718 by just 11 seconds.

Official results

References

Targa Florio
Targa Florio